An asphalt plant is a plant used for the manufacture of asphalt, macadam and other forms of coated roadstone, sometimes collectively known as blacktop or asphalt concrete.

The manufacture of coated roadstone demands the combination of a number of aggregates, sand and a filler (such as stone dust), in the correct proportions, heated, and finally coated with a binder, usually bitumen based or, in some cases tar, although tar was removed from BS4987 in 2001 and is not referred to in BSEN 13108/1. The temperature of the finished product must be sufficient to be workable after transport to the final destination. A temperature in the range of 100 to 200 degrees Celsius is normal.

Countries have individual specifications stipulating how much of the raw material can be allowed from recycled asphalt. In-depth research shows that addition of up to 20% recycled asphalt produces the same quality of asphalt compared to 100% virgin material. The quality of asphalt starts reducing once the percentage of recycled asphalt increases beyond 20%.

Main Structure

The asphalt plant is mainly composed of cold aggregate supply system, drum dryer, coal burner, coal feeder, dust collector, hot aggregate elevator, vibrating screen, filler supply system, weighing and mixing system, Pollution Control Unit , asphalt storage, bitumen supply system. All these components have characteristics that impact not only the overall quality of the asphalt but also the effect on the environment.

References

Asphalt